Deborah Moore is an actress.

Deborah Moore may also refer to:

Deborah Moore (presenter), Canadian television presenter
Deborah Dash Moore, professor of history

See also
Debbie Moore, singer
Debora Moore, artist